King City Township is a township in McPherson County, Kansas, in the United States.

King City Township was organized in 1874. As of the 2020 census, it had a population of 506.

References

Townships in McPherson County, Kansas
Townships in Kansas
Unincorporated communities in Kansas
1874 establishments in Kansas
Populated places established in 1874